Kujau may refer to:
Konrad Kujau, a German illustrator and forger
Kujawy, Opole Voivodeship, a village in Krapkowice County, Poland, formerly part of Germany